La Guaira is the capital city of the Venezuelan state of the same name (formerly named Vargas) and the country's main port.  It was founded in 1577 as an outlet for Caracas,  to the southeast.  The town and the port were badly damaged during the December 1999 floods and mudslides that affected much of the region.

The city hosts its own professional baseball team in the Venezuelan Professional Baseball League, the Tiburones de La Guaira. They have won seven national championships since their founding in 1962.

History

After the founding of Caracas by Spanish in 1567, toward the turn of the 16th century, the Port of La Guaira emerged on the coast and, since that time, has been the gateway to Caracas. This coastal city, almost without land to develop and bathed by the Caribbean Sea, became an important harbour during the 18th century. Attacked by buccaneers and by the English, Dutch, and French armadas, La Guaira was transformed into a fortified, walled city. During the War of Jenkins' Ear (1739–1748), the first attack of the Royal Navy  took place on La Guaira. This period also saw the trading monopoly of the Royal Gipuzkoan Company of Caracas, which controlled the major ports of La Guaira and Puerto Cabello and was instrumental in the development of large-scale cocoa production along the valleys of the coast. The English frigate HMS Hermione (1782) was delivered to the Spanish authorities at La Guaira after her crew mutinied in 1797. Another small naval battle was fought off La Guaira in 1812, between privateers of the United States and the United Kingdom. Now La Guaira is the second port by importance in Venezuela after Puerto Cabello.

Geography

La Guaira Bank is an underwater ridge that is approximately 12 miles off the coast from the city of La Guaira. The area provides the structure to deep-sea animals, and other organisms such as gorgonians, sponges, and coral, that require ocean currents to bring their food to them. Westerly currents flow off the coast of Venezuela, and the bank acts as a barrier to the current, creating an upwelling of nutrients to the ocean surface from deep-water stockpiles. These nutrients fuel an explosion of planktonic plant and animal growth, and attract larger animals such as whales, porpoises, seabirds, and large pelagics such as tuna, sharks, wahoo, dolphin fish, and four different types of marlin. It is considered one of the top sport fishing destinations in the world due to the unusually high numbers of Atlantic blue marlin, white marlin, sailfish, and spearfish that congregate at different seasons, and are available year-round.

References

 
Cities in Vargas (state)
Populated places established in 1577
Port cities in the Caribbean
Port cities in Venezuela
Ports and harbours of Venezuela